Marella Cruises (formerly Thomson Cruises) is a British cruise line operated by TUI UK, offering cruise holidays around Europe, the Caribbean, and Asia.

History
The company had initially entered the cruise market in 1973, but due to rising fuel costs the venture was terminated in 1976. In 1995, Thomson restarted their cruise line after their competitor Airtours had made a successful entry in the cruise business under their Sun Cruises brand. On 9 October 2017, TUI Group announced that Thomson Cruises would be rebranded in late October 2017 as Marella Cruises, with all of the existing Thomson fleet adopting the name change either from Thomson or TUI to Marella (except Thomson Spirit which will be renamed Spirit and Thomson Majesty which will be transferred to Celestyal Cruises). The line also announced that it would base TUI Discovery in Asia for the Winter season of 2018, with the ship being based out of Malaysia, the first in the line's history.

In 2012, Marella Cruises holds approximately a 1% market share of the worldwide cruise industry.

In May 2021, with the cruise sector planning for revival following the COVID-19 pandemic, TUI were reported to be planning to merge Marella Cruises with their TUI Cruises joint venture with Royal Caribbean, as they had already done with Hapag-Lloyd Cruises.

Fleet
MS Island Escape was added to the Thomson fleet in April 2009, as a result of parent company TUI's acquisition of Royal Caribbean Cruises Ltd.'s share in Island Cruises that took place in 2008. As of March 2013, Thomson operates the Island Escape under its all-inclusive Island Cruises brand.

In March 2015, Royal Caribbean International announced that they had agreed to sell  to TUI Cruises in the second quarter of 2016, and that TUI would lease the ship to Thomson Cruises to replace the Island Escape.

In May 2015, TUI Group announced that as part of their modernization strategy, TUI Cruises'  and  would be transferred to Thomson Cruises over the next few years.

In October 2015, the Island Cruise brand was discontinued after the sole ship Island Escape completed her last scheduled cruise with Thomson Cruises.

In March 2017, it was announced that Mein Schiff 1 would join the fleet in May 2018, and would become the TUI Explorer.

In July 2017, Thomson had announced that they would be extending the Thomson Spirit Lease until October 2018, and she will be based out of Palma for 18 April and then based in Malaga from May 2018 with her last cruise being on 21 October 2018.

In March 2018, it was announced that Royal Caribbean Cruises and Ctrip were to close the SkySea Cruise Line brand and that the line's sole ship SkySea Golden Era would join the Marella fleet in place of Mein Schiff 2 which would stay with TUI Cruises.

In April 2020 due to the ongoing COVID-19 pandemic, it was announced that Marella Celebration would be immediately retired from the fleet. The same was announced for Marella Dream in October 2020.

Current

Future

Former

Accidents and incidents
The lifeboat ropes snapped and it plunged 65 ft from the upper deck into the sea. It overturned as it hit the water, trapping them underneath. Three crewmen were taken to hospital, but five others - three Indonesians, one Filipino and one Ghanaian - drowned as rescue attempts were made.

References

TUI Group
Cruise lines
British companies established in 1973
Transport companies established in 1973
Companies disestablished in 1976
British companies established in 1995
Transport companies established in 1995
Re-established companies
1973 establishments in England